Howard School, also known as Perry Township School #1, is a historic school building located at Perry Township, Boone County, Indiana.  It was built about 1881, and is a one-story, rectangular red brick building with Italianate style design elements.  The school closed in 1916.  It was restored starting in 2004.

It was listed on the National Register of Historic Places in 2009.

References

School buildings on the National Register of Historic Places in Indiana
Italianate architecture in Indiana
School buildings completed in 1881
Schools in Boone County, Indiana
National Register of Historic Places in Boone County, Indiana
1881 establishments in Indiana